Aborichthys verticauda is a species of stone loach found in a stream joining the Ranga River in the Lower Subanshri district in India. This fish grows to a length of  SL.

References

Nemacheilidae
Fish of Asia
Freshwater fish of India
Taxa named by Muthukumarasamy Arunachalam
Taxa named by Manickam Raja
Taxa named by Punniyam Malaiammal
Taxa named by Richard L. Mayden
Fish described in 2014